Mod DB is a website that focuses on general video game modding. It was founded in 2002 by Scott "INtense!" Reismanis. As of September 2015, the Mod DB site has received over 604 million views, has more than 12,500 modifications registered, and has hosted more than 108 million downloads. A spin-off website, Indie DB, was launched in 2010 and focuses on indie games and news.

History
Scott Reismanis, a website developer from Melbourne, Australia, first pursued web development as a hobby, creating two websites dedicated to video games. Afterwards, he purchased the ChaosRealm.com domain and formed the Realm Network. The network comprised over twenty websites, one of which was Mod DB's predecessor, ModRealm. Launched in 1998, ModRealm was initially dedicated to Counter-Strike cheat codes before becoming a modding website. The website became defunct on 17 December 2001, when its network was shut down after its hosting service, Playnet, filed for bankruptcy.

Reismanis was motivated to start a new website by the difficulty of searching for mods on the then-dominant search engine, AltaVista, much less mods released to the public. He began Mod DB's development on 11 January 2002, following IMDb's structure in the process. The website was launched as Mod Database on 8 June 2002. It differed from his earlier websites in that its articles were managed by the community, not only the website's founder. Mod DB rapidly expanded its viewership and database size. In 2006, the Mod DB team launched Addon DB, whose aim was to list additional content for games not applicable under the category of game modifications. This includes models, skins and maps. Just one year into service, it was merged into Mod DB.

Reismanis was an information technology consultant at Accenture and intended to keep Mod DB his hobby, but he left the firm to found DesuraNET as the website's hosting company, citing the expense of running the website and his recollection of IGN's 2006 attempt to acquire it. Mod DB was integrated into DesuraNET's Desura, which was a digital distribution service that focused on indie games. The service opened in April 2010 as a competitor to Valve's Steam.

Features
The purpose of Mod DB is to list the mods, files, tutorials and information of any games that are capable of being modded with user-made content. Community involvement is strongly encouraged, and any game mod with a website is allowed to post a screenshot gallery, news, and requests for help. Scott's intentions, from the beginning, were to get the community heavily involved in the creation and development of the website. To this end, the most active members were chosen as moderators and administrators. The core staff generally remain the same, while lower positions are heavily rotated among trainee moderators, and administrator candidates. The site's staff mostly act as chaperones or librarians, keeping appropriate content available to the public and featuring the more exceptional content.

Mod DB has a permissive approach to what content is allowed on the website, but the types of content forbidden by its terms of use include pornographic, defamatory, and obscene content, as well as material that incites crime or hatred, violates intellectual property law under the terms of the copyright law of Australia and the Digital Millennium Copyright Act, or otherwise "brings [the website] into disrepute." Nevertheless, the website received mainstream media attention when in early 2011 it hosted School Shooter: North American Tour 2012, a Half-Life 2 mod in which the player assumes the role of a school student with the goal of murdering as many people as possible before being stopped by police and SWAT members. The mod's premise led to a spate of mail accusing the website of being involved in the project, prompting the website to shut it down in March.

Mod of the Year
Mod DB's Mod of the Year competition, the Golden Spanner awards, aim to set the industry standard in awarding inventive and high-quality mods. Mods are chosen via a community vote and are then reviewed by staff to produce the final list of winners. The competition aims to encourage all fields of modding, with different categories such as graphics and gameplay, as well as a traditional 'best mod' winner. Notable winners include Garry's Mod for Half-Life 2 in 2005, Insurgency: Modern Infantry Combat for Half-Life 2 in 2007, Black Mesa for Half-Life in 2012, and Brutal Doom for Doom in 2017. Similarly, Mod DB's Mod Hall of Fame retrospectively reviews mods and inducts what it judges to be the greatest mods of the year of their release. Inductees include PlayerUnknown's Battle Royale for ARMA 3 in 2014.

Indie DB
Indie DB is an offshoot of Mod DB launched in June 2010. It is dedicated to indie gaming and serves as a repository for those games. Like Mod DB, the website hosts an annual competition for the best indie game of the year, with the games being voted on in categories and overall. Also like Mod DB, the nominees are selected by the site's editors and voted on by its readers. Winners of the Indie of the Year Awards include Minecraft by Mojang in 2010, RimWorld by Ludeon Studios in 2016 and Ion Fury by Voidpoint in 2019.

References

External links
 The Mod DB website
 The Indie DB website
 DBolical

Australian entertainment websites
Internet properties established in 2002
Online game databases
Video game mods